Countess Friederike Charlotte Antoinette of Dohna-Schlodien in Leistenau (3 July 1738 – 21 April 1785 or 21 April 1786) was a German noble woman.

Charlotte, as she was known, was born in Königsberg, Prussia, on 3 July 1738. She was the daughter of Albrecht Christoph, Count (or Burgrave) of Dohna-Schlodien in Leistenau, by his third wife Princess Sophie Henriette of Schleswig-Holstein-Sonderburg-Beck. She was married, firstly, to her first cousin Karl Anton August, Prince of Schleswig-Holstein-Sonderburg-Beck (1727–1759) in Königsberg on 30 May 1754.

They had an only child: Friedrich Karl Ludwig, Duke of Schleswig-Holstein-Sonderburg-Beck.

She was the descendant of the Oxenstierna noble family of Sweden, which was related to many of the old noble families of Sweden and Norway including Charles VIII of Sweden. As the male-line great-grandmother of Christian IX of Denmark, she is an ancestor of the monarchs of Norway, Denmark, Greece and the United Kingdom.

Her first husband died in 1759 from wounds sustained at the battle of Kunersdorf. She later married Count Friedrich Detlev von Moltke, as her second husband, on 21 May 1777. They had no issue.

Ancestry

References 

1738 births
1780s deaths
Nobility from Königsberg
Charlotte
18th-century Danish nobility
German countesses